Robert Levy may refer to:

Films
Robert Levy (producer) (1888–1959), American film producer significant in establishing blacks as successful actors
Robert L. Levy (film producer), American film producer
I. Robert Levy, American editor, producer and director, known from If You Don't Stop It... You'll Go Blind and Can I Do It... 'Til I Need Glasses?

Others
Robert I. Levy (1924–2003), American psychiatrist and anthropologist
Robert A. Levy (born 1941), American lawyer, pundit, and entrepreneur
Robert L. Levy (cardiologist) (1888–1974), American cardiologist and professor
Robert Levy (author) (born 1974), American author

See also
Bob Levy (disambiguation)